The 1986 season of the Paraguayan Primera División, the top category of Paraguayan football, was played by 10 teams. The national champions were Sol de América.

Results

First stage

First-place play-off

Second stage

Third stage

Aggregate Table

Final Stage
 Teams started with the following "bonus" points: Sol de América with 3 bonus points, Guaraní and Libertad with 2 bonus points, and Olimpia and Atlético Colegiales with 1 bonus point.

External links
Paraguay 1986 season at RSSSF

Para
Paraguayan Primera División seasons
1